Married to Medicine (also known as Married to Medicine: Atlanta) is an American reality television series and franchise that premiered on Bravo on March 24, 2013. The series chronicles the personal and professional lives of several women in the Atlanta medical community with four of the women being doctors themselves, while the others are doctors' wives. It shows the group as they balance their social circles, careers and families.

The confirmed cast for the upcoming tenth season consists of Dr. Jacqueline Walters, Dr. Simone Whitmore, Toya Bush-Harris, Quad Webb, Dr. Heavenly Kimes and Phaedra Parks.

Production
In November 2012, Bravo announced the series green-light of Married to Medicine. The network detailed the series by stating, "Married to Medicine follows a group of successful and educated women, including doctors and wives of doctors, who are connected to the world of medicine in Atlanta." Purveyors of Pop, a production company formed by Real Housewives producers Matt Anderson and Nate Green, produced the series, its second on Bravo after The Real Housewives of Miami. At the time of its debut, Married to Medicine held the title of highest-rated series premiere since Bethenny Getting Married? in 2010 and the most watched non-spinoff series premiere in the network's history. The milestone was later surpassed in January 2014 by Blood, Sweat and Heels. The first season delivered over 1 million viewers in the 18-49 viewership demographic and 1.8 million total viewers, making it the network's highest-rated non-franchise/non-spin-off freshman series since Queer Eye for the Straight Guy.

The success of the show has resulted in two spin-offs, set in Houston and Los Angeles. The former premiered on November 11, 2016; whilst the latter began airing on March 10, 2019.

Overview and casting

Seasons 1–4
The first season was shot in Atlanta in September and October 2012. By February 2013, the first-season cast was revealed with Toya Bush-Harris, Mariah Huq, Quad Webb-Lunceford, Jacqueline Walters, Kari Wells, and Simone Whitmore starring in the series. The series premiered on March 24, 2013.

The production of the second season began the first week of September 2013. It premiered on April 6, 2014, with Bush-Harris, Huq, Webb-Lunceford, Walters, and Whitmore reprising their roles while Lisa Nicole Cloud and Heavenly Kimes joined the series beginning with the second season after the departure of Wells, who made guest appearances throughout the season.

On January 15, 2015, Bravo renewed the show for a third season, which premiered on June 7, 2015, and featured Bush-Harris, Lunceford, Walters, Whitmore, Kimes, and Cloud reprising their roles from the second season. Huq transitioned into a recurring role for the third season, while Jill Connors, who had guest-starred in the second season, was featured in a recurring capacity. Former cast member Wells made a guest appearance.

Sources revealed on April 27, 2016, that the show had been renewed for a fourth season by Bravo, and the current cast were already six weeks into filming. The entire cast from the third season returned as series regulars, along with Huq returning in a recurring capacity and Wells in a guest role, joined by friend of the show, Genise Shelton.

Seasons 5–7
On June 19, 2017, it was confirmed that majority of the cast would be returning for the upcoming fifth season, with the exception of Cloud and Shelton, the latter of whom made a guest appearance alongside Wells. Huq returned in a recurring capacity. On September 19, 2017, Bravo announced the premiere date for the fifth season, along with a trailer and the reveal of the new cast member, Dr. Contessa Metcalfe, who officially joined the main cast from the third episode.

On April 11, 2018, Bravo renewed the show for a sixth season, which premiered on September 2, 2018. On August 2, 2018, the trailer for the sixth season was released. The cast was also revealed, reconfirming the majority of the cast of the fifth season, along with Huq rejoining the main cast. Dr. Jarrett Manning was introduced in a 'friend' capacity after appearing in the prior season as a guest, with Wells making a guest appearance.

On August 6, 2019, the show was renewed for a seventh season which premiered on September 8, 2019. Manning returned as a guest with Wells, whilst Buffie Purselle was made a friend of the cast. This marked the last appearance of the show's creator, executive producer and main cast member, Huq, who left the series after seven seasons.

Seasons 8–present
On January 13, 2021, the show was renewed for an eighth season which premiered on March 7, 2021; introducing Anila Sajja as a main cast member. Cloud and Wells returned to the series in recurring capacities.

On May 12, 2022, the show was renewed for a ninth season which premiered on July 10, 2022, with Quad rejoining the main cast, alongside Audra Frimpong and Wells as friends of the doctors and doctor's wives. Cloud exited the series ahead of the show's ninth season.

In January 2023, it was reported that Phaedra Parks was in talks to join the series for its tenth season. Previously starring in The Real Housewives of Atlanta, it marks the second of Bravo talent to have starred in a full-time capacity of two different franchises.  In March 2023, this was officially confirmed, as well as that Metcalfe exited the show and Sajja was fired ahead of Season 10.

Timeline of cast members

Series overview

References

External links

2010s American medical television series
2020s American medical television series
2013 American television series debuts
2010s American reality television series
2020s American reality television series
English-language television shows
Bravo (American TV network) original programming
Television series by Fremantle (company)
Television shows set in Atlanta
Women in Georgia (U.S. state)